Eupithecia nachadira is a moth in the family Geometridae. It is found in Afghanistan and Iran, as well as Ukraine.

References

Moths described in 1941
nachadira
Moths of Europe
Moths of Asia